is a Japanese Nippon Professional Baseball player. He is currently with the Chunichi Dragons.

Notes and references

External links 

NPB

1989 births
Living people
Japanese baseball players
Chunichi Dragons players
Baseball people from Yokohama